The 2022–23 season is Galatasaray's 68th season in the existence of the club. The team plays in the Women's Basketball Super League and in the Turkish Women's Basketball Cup.

Overview

April
On 27 April 2022, it was announced that Efe Güven, who has been working as Galatasaray Women's Basketball coach since 2018, parted ways.

July
On 7 July 2022, it was announced that a one-year agreement was reached with Alper Durur for the position of coaching the Galatasaray Women's Basketball Team.

Müge Erdem was appointed as the General Manager of Women's Basketball on 21 July 2022.

In the announcement made on 14 July 2022, Galatasaray in the European cups will take part in the FIBA EuroCup Women in the 2022–23 season.

August
The fixture of the 2022–23 season of the Women's Basketball Super League was determined with the drawing of lots held on 31 August 2022 at Sinan Erdem Dome.

September
In the notification made on 19 September 2022, it was announced that Çağdaş Faktoring is the name sponsor of our Galatasaray Women's Basketball Team.

At the press conference held at Ali Sami Yen Sports Complex on 21 September 2022, a naming sponsorship agreement was signed with Çağdaş Faktoring.

Sponsorship and kit manufacturers

Supplier: Umbro
Name sponsor: Çağdaş Faktoring
Main sponsor: Çağdaş Faktoring
Back sponsor: —

Sleeve sponsor: —
Lateral sponsor: GAMI
Short sponsor: HDI Sigorta, Tunç Holding
Socks sponsor: —

Team

Players

Depth chart

Squad changes

In

|}

Out

|}

Out on loan

|}

Staff and management

Pre-season and friendlies

Friendly match

Competitions

Overview

Women's Basketball Super League

League table

Results summary

Results by round

Matches

Note: All times are TRT (UTC+3) as listed by the Turkish Basketball Federation.

EuroCup Women

Regular season (Group C)

Results summary

Results by round

Matches

Note: All times are CET (UTC+1) as listed by EuroCup.

Play-Off Round 1

Note: All times are CET (UTC+1) as listed by EuroCup.

Round of 16

Note: All times are CET (UTC+1) as listed by EuroCup.

Quarterfinals

Note: All times are CET (UTC+1) as listed by EuroCup.

Semifinals

Note: All times are CET (UTC+1) as listed by EuroCup.

Turkish Women's Basketball Cup

Quarterfinals

References

External links
Galatasaray Kadın Basketbol Takımı - GALATASARAY.ORG 
Galatasaray Basketbol (@GSBasketbol) _ Twitter 
Galatasaray - EuroCup Women 2022-23 - FIBA.basketball 

Galatasaray
Galatasaray S.K. (women's basketball) seasons
Galatasaray Sports Club 2022–23 season